Crane Currency is a manufacturer of cotton based paper products used in the printing  of banknotes, passports, and other secure documents.

History
Stephen Crane was the first in the Crane family to become a papermaker, buying his first mill, "The Liberty Paper Mill," in 1770. He sold currency-type paper to engraver Paul Revere, who printed paper money for the American Colonies. In 1801, Crane was founded by Zenas Crane, Henry Wiswall and John Willard. It was the very first paper mill in the United States west of the Connecticut River. The company's original mill had a daily output of 20 posts (1 post = 125 sheets). Shortly after, in 1806, Crane began printing currency on cotton paper for local, as well as regional, banks, before officially printing for the government. In 1844 Crane developed a method to embed parallel silk threads in banknote paper to denominate notes and deter counterfeiting.

In 1879, Crane grew when Winthrop M. Crane won a contract to deliver U.S. currency paper to the Bureau of Engraving and Printing in Washington, D.C. To shore up resources for this contract, Crane expanded its capacity with four new mills engineered by world-renowned mill architect David H. Tower. Tower, a native of Dalton would remain connected to the development of the company throughout his career, having gotten his first start in mill architecture working as an apprentice to rebuild Zena Crane's Red Mill in 1846. Crane produced both the yellow (issued in 1883–1884) and the white (1884–1894) watermarked security papers for the nation's Postal Notes. These early money orders were produced for sale throughout the postal system by the Homer Lee Bank Note Company (1883–1887), the American Bank Note Company (1887–1891), and Dunlap & Clarke (1891–1894). In 1922, Crane & Co. incorporated, with Frederick G. Crane elected as president.

In 1960, Crane & Co. stationery presented an ad campaign intended to expand the use of written correspondence. The campaign, run by Margaret Hockaday's advertising firm, presented examples of letters that could be written but did not present images of the stationery. An article in the New York Times detailed the fictional people writing the letters. In 2015, Crane announced that it would be turning over its stationery division to employees via a "management buyout" by the end of December. 

In 2002, Crane purchased the company Tumba Bruk from the Central Bank of Sweden (Riksbank) and operates this today as Crane AB.

In 2016, Crane announced plans to build a new banknote printing facility and customer experience center in the country of Malta. The facility will be 15,000 square meters in size and will have space for three print lines. The "state-of-the-art" $100 million facility was announced on Wednesday, September 21, 2016 by Maltese Prime Minister Joseph Muscat.

In 2017 Crane Currency was sold to Crane Co., now known as Crane Holdings.

MOTION
Crane Currency's MOTION security technology is being introduced into high denomination banknotes worldwide. The design involves a micro-lens array interacting with graphics far smaller than any microprinting.

Sweden's 1000 kronor banknote, released in 2006, was the first banknote to use Crane's MOTION technology. A 2007 AP article revealed that the US Bureau of Engraving and Printing will use a new security thread containing "650,000 tiny lenses" (now believed to be over one million lenses per inch of thread). It is currently being used on the $100 bill design released on October 8, 2013.

In 2008, Crane acquired Visual Physics, a subsidiary of Nanoventions, based in Atlanta, Georgia. This purchase gave Crane exclusive control of the Motion micro-optic security technology that is used for the protection of banknotes.

In 2014, Crane introduced its second security thread based on its micro-optic technology. The smaller lenses used in RAPID micro-optic thread enable rapid movement and high color contrast. RAPID uses dynamic movement as the key to easy authentication. Fast moving and unambiguous movement with just a modest tilt of the note are the feature's trademark.

MOTION SURFACE, introduced in 2017, is based on miniaturized Motion micro-optic lenses that produce fluid movement and three dimensional effects. It is applied as a stripe as opposed to being integrated as a thread. Therefore, MOTION SURFACE can be applied in the printing works.

Presidents/CEOs
Frederick G. Crane (1922–1923)
Winthrop M. Crane Jr. (1923–1951)
Bruce Crane (1951–1975)
Benjamin J. Sullivan (1975–1986)
Thomas A. White (1986–1995)
Lansing Crane (1995–2007)
Charles Kittredge (2007–2011)
Stephen DeFalco (2011–2018)
Annemarie Watson (2018–2020)
Sam Keayes (2020–present)

See also
Crane and Company Old Stone Mill Rag Room

References

External links
 Crane Currency
 

1801 establishments in Massachusetts
Banknote printing companies
Manufacturing companies based in Boston
Manufacturing companies established in 1801
Paper money of the United States
Pulp and paper companies of the United States
American companies established in 1801
Crane family
American stationers
Privately held companies based in Massachusetts